Berry Hill is a historic home and farm complex located near Danville, Pittsylvania County, Virginia, United States. The main house was built in several sections during the 19th and early 20th centuries, taking its present form about 1910.  The original section of the main house consists of a two-story, three-bay structure connected by a hyphen to a -story wing set perpendicular to the main block. Connected by a hyphen is a one-story, single-cell wing probably built in the 1840s. Enveloping the front wall and the hyphen of the original house is a large, two-story structure built about 1910 with a shallow gambrel roof with bell-cast eaves.  Located on the property are a large assemblage of contributing outbuildings including the former kitchen/laundry, the "lumber shed," the smokehouse, the dairy, a small gable-roofed log cabin, a chicken house, a log slave house, log corn crib, and a log stable.

It was listed on the National Register of Historic Places in 1980.

References

External links
Berry Hill, Danville vic., Pittsylvania County, Virginia: Carnegie Survey of the Architecture of the South (Library of Congress).

Houses on the National Register of Historic Places in Virginia
Houses completed in 1910
Houses in Pittsylvania County, Virginia
National Register of Historic Places in Pittsylvania County, Virginia